West End is a neighborhood in Cincinnati, Ohio, United States, located northwest of downtown, east of Queensgate, west of Over-the-Rhine, and southeast of Fairview. The population was 6,824 at the 2020 Census.

History of the neighborhood
The historic West End was largely razed in the 1950s and 60s which lead to a very large drop in population from 67,520 in 1950 to 17,068 in 1970. This razing was done as part of a series of urban renewal projects and the construction of Interstate 75, its interchange with Interstate 71 and the construction of the 6th St Expressway for U.S. Route 50.

The largest of these urban renewal projects was the Kenyon-Barr Renewal Plan. This plan formed the industrial neighborhood Queensgate through razing of the Lower West End from 1959-1973. The Queensgate project was undertaken in phases over roughly four decades. Queensgate I resulted in an undistinguished but successful industrial park, which includes service industries, light manufacturing, transportation facilities and warehouses as well as offices, hotels and restaurants. I-75 and Queensgate I together made up the nation’s second largest so-called 'slum clearance' up to that time. Nearly 3,700 buildings on 450 acres were razed. 9800 families, 27,000 people— 97% of whom were Black—were displaced. Combined with other projects such as Richmond-Laurel, this caused massive amounts of displacement, leading to 50,452 Cincinnatians being forced to relocate or move elsewhere in the city from 1950 to 1970. 

The West End is the location of City West, the largest housing development project in Cincinnati since World War II. The project transformed the once low-income area into mixed-income development. In 1999 many of the blighted, cramped buildings were leveled to make way for new townhomes with ample parking. In 2007, part 1 crimes were down by 30% when compared to 1999.

Controversy erupted in 2005 when plans were announced to open a $15-million "one-stop" social services facility at 800 Bank Street. The project, known as CityLink, would be the largest such facility in Cincinnati. Some argued that it would increase crime and poverty in the West End, decrease property value, and undermine the redevelopment there. Some even accused the city of trying to relocate the poor from the thriving Over-the-Rhine neighborhood to the West End. However, proponents argued that the West End's central location makes it easy for the poor to access. A lawsuit to stop the CityLink project failed, as did the subsequent appeal to the Ohio Supreme Court.  CityLink Center has since launched in 2013, serving over 3,000 Cincinnati residents since that time including over 250 from the West End neighborhood.  Individuals engage in the center to advance their lives holistically through the integrated support of over 14 on-site agencies.  The development of CityLink Center has not resulted in crime, development has actually further continued, and property values have increased.

The West End is served by a branch of the Public Library of Cincinnati and Hamilton County.

TQL Stadium, the home stadium of Major League Soccer team FC Cincinnati, is located in the neighborhood.

Demographics
The West End peaked in population in 1890 at 84,374 residents, equaling a density in the 2 square mile neighborhood of 42,185 per square mile. This made the neighborhood on par with population density only found in New York City at the time. It fell with the population shift to outer Cincinnati neighborhoods from 1890-1920 but reached a secondary peak in 1950 at 67,522 residents. Every census from then until 2010 the neighborhood dramatically declined in population. 6,824 live in the neighborhood as of the 2020 Census, representing an increase from the 2010 Census.

2000 data unavailable.
Source - US Census 1940-80 
Cincinnati Statistical Neighborhood Database 1990-2020
Population Changes - Cincinnati and adjacent areas; 1900-1940.

Historic architecture and districts

 Laurel Homes
 Union Terminal, 1301 Western Ave
 Dayton Street Historic District
 Betts–Longworth Historic District
 Betts House, 416 Clark St
 Washburn School (Now Cincinnati College Preparatory Academy West), 1425 Linn St
 Former Lafayette-Bloom School, 1941 Baymiller St.
 The Regal Theatre, Clark and Linn Street
 The State Theatre, 1504 Central Ave
 St. Joseph's Catholic School, 745 Ezzard Charles Dr.
 Former Heberle Elementary School, 2009 Freeman Ave.

References

Further reading
Harshaw, J. W. (2009). Cincinnati's West End: Through our eyes. United States: CreateSpace.

Singer, A. J. (2005). Stepping out in Cincinnati: Queen City Entertainment 1900-1960. Mount Pleasant, SC: Arcadia Publishing.

External links
Comprehensive West End Revitalization Plan
Official CityLink site
Ezzard Charles Drive, the Making of a Parkway 
Master Plan for Redevelopment of the Kenyon-Barr Urban Renewal Area, 1959

 
Neighborhoods in Cincinnati